Aghbolagh-e Olya, also rendered as Aqbolagh-e Olya, may refer to:
 Aghbolagh-e Olya, East Azerbaijan
 Aghbolagh-e Olya, West Azerbaijan